Dumas may refer to:

Places 
Dumas, Arkansas, United States, a city
Dumas, Mississippi, United States, a town
Dumas, Missouri, United States, an unincorporated community
Dumas, Texas, United States, a city
Mount Dumas, a mountain on Campbell Island, New Zealand
Dumas Beach, a beach southwest of Surat, Gujarat, India
9059 Dumas, an asteroid

People 
 Dumas (surname)
 Dumas (musician) (born 1979), Canadian singer born Steve Dumas
 Dumas Malone (1892–1986), Pulitzer Prize-winning American historian, biographer, and editor
 Dumas or Dumarsais Simeus (born 1939), Haitian-born American businessman who ran for president of Haiti
 Alexandre Dumas (1802–1870) French author and aristocrat.

Fictional characters 
Dumas (Kiba), a character in the Japanese anime Kiba
Duke Dumas, ruler of the vampires in the video game Lunar Knights
Dumas, a DC Comics character in the Manhunter comics

Other uses 
Dumas High School, a high school in Arkansas
Dumas Brothel, a bordello in Butte, Montana, United States
Dumas House, an office building in Perth, Western Australia
Dumas (film), a 2010 French film

See also
Dumas method
Dumas method of molecular weight determination
Duma (disambiguation)